The second  was laid down as ATR-113, reclassified ATA-186 on 15 May 1944, and launched 18 September 1944 by Levingston Shipbuilding Co., Orange, Texas; and commissioned 24 November 1944. She was assigned the name Cahokia 16 July 1948.

Cahokia sailed from Galveston, Texas, 23 December 1944, for the Panama Canal Zone, San Francisco, and then for Pearl Harbor 4 March 1945, and assumed towing duty between Ulithi, Manus, Leyte, the Russell Islands, and Okinawa, until 8 September when she arrived in Tokyo Bay. She supported the occupation of Japan until 14 October, when she sailed from Yokosuka for Okinawa, arriving 17 October. She had duty at Okinawa, with a brief period at Shanghai and Jinsen until 22 April 1946. On 4 May Cahokia departed Sasebo for Manus and Pearl Harbor. After almost a month in Pearl, she sailed for San Francisco, arriving 15 July for duty with the 12th Naval District.

Cahokia undertook a variety of assignments through 1950. Between 16 and 18 June 1954, she delivered water to Alcatraz Penitentiary when the prison's water system failed, and on 1 April 1955, she assisted in quelling a serious fire in San Francisco's Ferry Building. Her duties since have included coastal towing duty, search and rescue operations, target towing, and dumping atomic waste material for the U.S. Naval Radiological Defense Laboratory at San Francisco.

References
 
  NavSource Online: Service Ship Photo Archive USS Cahokia (ATA-186)

 

1944 ships
Ships built in Orange, Texas
Sotoyomo-class tugs
Sotoyomo-class tugs of the Republic of China Navy